Hüseyin Çakıroğlu (19 September 1957 – 26 October 1986), nicknamed Doktor (English, the doctor) was a Turkish footballer who played as a midfielder. A ten-time international for the Turkey national football team, Çakıroğlu died suddenly of cancer in 1986 at the age of 29.

Professional career and death
Çakıroğlu had discomfort in his leg from a slow-growing tumor, but despite openly suffering from it became a professional footballer. Çakıroğlu spent his early career with Gaziantepspor, and stayed with the team even when they were relegated despite interest from Fenerbahçe. He ended up transferring to Fenerbahçe in 1984, and in his first season with them helped them win the Süper Lig.

In the summer of 1986, Çakıroğlu's condition worsened, and it was found that the tumor in his leg had metastasized, spreading to his lungs and brain. He was taken to the United States for treatment but died on 26 October 1986.

Honours
Fenerbahçe
Süper Lig (1): 1984–1985
Turkish Super Cup (2): 1984, 1985
Fleet Cup (1): 1984
Istanbul TSYD Cup (1): 1985
Gaziantepspor
Adana TSYD Cup (1): 1979

References

External links
 
 
 NFT Profile

1957 births
1986 deaths
Footballers from Istanbul
Turkish footballers
Turkey international footballers
Turkey youth international footballers
Association football midfielders
Fenerbahçe S.K. footballers
Gaziantepspor footballers
Kardemir Karabükspor footballers
Süper Lig players
TFF First League players
Deaths from cancer in Turkey